Incilius signifer is a species of toads in the family Bufonidae. It is endemic to Panama and known from the Pacific Coast to  asl, west of the Canal Zone. Prior to its description in 2005, it was mixed with Incilius coccifer. Its natural habitats are tropical dry forests. It tolerates habitat modification but could be threatened by severe habitat modification.

References

signifer
Endemic fauna of Panama
Amphibians of Panama
Amphibians described in 2005
Taxonomy articles created by Polbot